Boys Nation is an annual forum concerning civic training, government, leadership, and Americanism that is run by the American Legion. One hundred Boys Nation Senators are chosen from a pool of over 20,000 Boys State participants, making it one of the most selective educational programs in the United States.

Each year, two delegates in the summer after their junior year of high school are selected from each of the fifty American Legion Boys State programs in the United States (Hawaii does not host a Boys State however Washington DC does). These delegates attend a week-long event in Washington, DC funded by scholarships.

The event endeavors to teach delegates about the processes of the Federal government of the United States by establishing a mock Senate and organizing mock elections of a Boys Nation Senate President Pro Tempore, Senate Secretary, Vice President, and President. Senators also attend lectures and forums, and visit governmental institutions and historical sites. Tom Brokaw and former president Bill Clinton were previous Boys Nation representatives. It is a tradition for the student senators to take a private tour of the White House and be received by the current president. Boys Nation senators also ordinarily receive private tours of the United States Supreme Court, the Congress, the Pentagon, and the State Department, several senators have also met with the incumbent president, including Donald Trump in 2017.

Students assume the role of a United States Senator, representing their respective (Boys) State. They write and introduce bills and debate in the senate chambers. Delegates are split into political parties and draft a party platform as well as perform usual party duties like nominations for president and vice-president, along with elected party leadership.

The American Legion Auxiliary runs a similar event called Girls Nation.

Notable alumni
 David Barlow, United States Attorney, District of Utah 
 Max Baucus, United States Ambassador and Senator, Montana
 Beau Biden, Attorney General of Delaware
 Tom Brokaw, Former NBC anchorman
 Steve Bullock, Governor of Montana
 Aneesh Chopra, United States Chief Technology Officer
 Chris Christie, Former Governor of New Jersey
 David Cicilline, United States Representative, Rhode Island
 Bill Clinton, 42nd President of the United States
 Tom Cotton, United States Senator, Arkansas
 Mitch Daniels, Former Governor of Indiana, Current President, Purdue University
 Lawrence DiCara, Attorney, Politician, former Boston City Council President
 H. Alston Johnson III, Former federal judicial nominee to the U.S. Court of Appeals for the Fifth Circuit
 Michael Jordan, professional NBA player
 John Neely Kennedy, United States Senator, Louisiana
 Alan Keyes, politician
 Mike Lee, United States Senator, Utah
 Joe Lieberman,  United States Senator, Connecticut and VP Candidate 
 Donal Logue, film and television actor
 Gray H. Miller, U.S. District Court Judge
 Nate Morris, Founder and CEO, Rubicon Global
 Eric Motley, Former State Department Official
 Scott Murphy, United States Representative, New York
 T. Charles Pierson, Former CEO of Big Brothers Big Sisters of America
 Andre Quintero, Mayor, El Monte, California
 Ben Sasse, United States Senator, Nebraska
 Jonathan Shapiro (writer), Emmy Award winning Producer/Writer
 Gaddi Vasquez, Former Director of the Peace Corps
 Scott Walker, 45th Governor of Wisconsin

See also
Badger Boys State
Pennsylvania Keystone Boys State

References

External links
Boys Nation official website
American Legion website

American Legion
Educational organizations based in the United States